Lannock Mill is a Grade II listed tower mill at Weston, Hertfordshire, England which is derelict.

History

Lannock Mill was built in 1860. A windmill had previously been shown on Warburton's map dated 1720 and Thomas Kitchin's map dated 1749. The mill was built by Richard Christy, who worked it until his son Richard took over in 1868. In 1882, Richard Christy Jr emigrated to America and the mill was taken over by Thomas Sanderson. He installed a steam engine as auxiliary power. The mill was badly damaged in a storm in the late 1880s. Repairs including new sails and cap were carried out by Course's, the Biggleswade millwrights. The steam engine was eventually replaced by a gas engine. The mill was working by wind into the early 1920s and by engine until 1929. The mill was stripped of machinery over the years, leaving the empty tower standing today.

Description

Lannock Mill is a five storey tower mill. It had an ogee cap winded by an eight bladed fantail. There were four Single Patent sails. The mill drove four pairs of millstones. The great spur wheel was of cast iron.

Millers
Richard Christy 1860-68
Richard Christy Jr 1868-82
Thomas Sanderson 1868-88
Charles T Stratton 1888-1929

Reference for above:-

References

External links
Windmill World webpage on Lannock Mill.

Windmills in Hertfordshire
Tower mills in the United Kingdom
Grinding mills in the United Kingdom
Windmills completed in 1860
Grade II listed buildings in Hertfordshire
Grade II listed windmills